The Eurocopter (now Airbus Helicopters) AS355 Écureuil 2 (or Twin Squirrel) is a twin-engine light utility helicopter developed and originally manufactured by Aérospatiale in France

The Écureuil 2 was directly derived from the single-engined AS350 Écureuil, performing its maiden flight on 28 September 1979 and introduced to service shortly thereafter. The type was commonly marketed in North America as the TwinStar. During the 1990s, Aérospatiale merged its helicopter interests into the multinational Eurocopter consortium; under this new entity, the Écureuil 2 continued to be manufactured. Shortly after Eurocopter's rebranding as Airbus Helicopters, the group decided to discontinue production of the Écureuil 2 during 2016, however, production of its single-engined siblings has continued since then.

Design and development
During the early 1970s, Aérospatiale initiated a development programme to produce a replacement for the aging Aérospatiale Alouette II. While the Aérospatiale Gazelle, which had been developed in the 1960s and 1970s, had been met with numerous orders by military customers, commercial sales of the type had been less than anticipated, thus the need for a civil-oriented development was identified.

The development of the new rotorcraft, which was headed by Chief Engineer René Mouille, was focused on the production of an economic and cost-effective aerial vehicle, thus both Aérospatiale's Production and Procurement departments were heavily involved in the design process. One such measure was the use of a rolled sheet structure, a manufacturing technique adapted from the automotive industry; another innovation was the newly developed Starflex main rotor. It was also decided that both civil and military variants of the emergent helicopter would be developed to conform with established military requirements.

On 27 June 1974, the first prototype, an AS350C powered by a Lycoming LTS101 turboshaft engine, conducted its maiden flight at Marignane, France; the second prototype, powered by a Turbomeca Arriel 1A, following on 14 February 1975. On 28 September 1979, a twin-engined version of the rotorcraft made its first flight; it was subsequently released and marketed under the names Écureuil 2, Twin Squirrel, and (in North America) TwinStar.

It was not long before overseas production of the type commenced. The Brazilian helicopter manufacturer Helibras' most numerous product in its lineup has been the Eurocopter AS350 Écureuil. The company had licence-assembled both the AS350 and AS355 from kits shipped from Eurocopter main production line for the family in Marignane, France; Brazilian AS355s contain a level of indigenously-developed content as well. During the 2000s, Eurocopter was reportedly in talks to open up an additional AS355 production line in China.

Despite the introduction of the Eurocopter EC130 in 2001, production of both the AS350 and AS355, and of their AS550 and AS555 Fennec militarized counterparts, was continued for some time. During 2007, the more capable AS355 NP variant, which was powered by Full Authority Digital Engine Control (FADEC) engines, was introduced to service. According to aerospace periodical Flight International, the decision to develop the AS355 NP, which Eurocopter stated was aimed at the corporate transport and utility operators, had been the firm's response to American competitor Bell Helicopter's launch of the Bell 417.

In addition to Eurocopter's internal efforts to enhance the Écureuil 2, third parties developed their own modifications and upgrades specifically for the type. Conversion programs and addons for the AS350 family have been produced and are offered by numerous 'aftermarket' specialists; many upgrade and refit programmes have involved the increasing use of digital systems, such as the Garmin-built G500H avionics suite.

During September 2015, Airbus Helicopters announced that the company had decided to terminate the manufacture of the AS355 as part of an effort to focus on stronger-selling rotorcraft. Production of the AS355 continued through 2016 until the existing order backlog had been fulfilled. Despite the termination of the AS355 programme, production of its AS350 siblings has continued and even been expanded around the same timeframe.

Variants

Twin engine

AS355
Prototype of the twin-engined Écureuil 2 or Twin Squirrel.
AS355 E
Initial production version, with single hydraulics, powered by two Allison 250-C20F turboshaft engines.
AS355 F
Improved version, with dual hydraulics and increased maximum weight of 2,300 kg (5,070 lb).

Powered by two Allison 250-C20F engines, 2,400 kg (5,291 lb) Maximum weight.
AS355 F2
Powered by two Allison 250-C20F engines, 2,540 kg (5,600 lb) Maximum weight and a yaw compensation system.
AS355 M
Initial armed version of AS355 F1.
AS355 M2
Armed version of AS355 F2. Superseded by AS555 Fennec.

Version fitted with two Turbomeca Arrius 1A engines and a Full Authority Digital Engine Control (FADEC) system for better M.T.O.W (2,600 kg or 5,732 lb) and better single engine performance, tail rotor strake added along starboard side of tail boom for better yaw authority.
AS355 NP Ecureuil 2
Introduced in 2007, this version is fitted with two Turbomeca Arrius 1A1 turboshaft engines and a new AS350 B3-based main gearbox, increasing maximum take-off weight to 2,800 kg (6,173 lb).
HB.355F Esquilo Bi
Assembled in Brazil by Helibras (part of Eurocopter).
HB.355N Esquilo Bi
Assembled in Brazil by Helibras.

Aftermarket conversions
Heli-Lynx 355FX1
Powered by the Allison C20F engine. FAA, TC, and EASA approved.
Heli-Lynx 355FX2
Powered by the Allison C20F engine. FAA, TC and EASA approved.
Heli-Lynx 355FX2R
Powered by the Allison C20R engine. FAA and TC approved.
Starflex AS355F1R
AS355 F1 powered by the Allison C20R engine. FAA, TC and EASA approved.
Starflex AS355F2R
AS355 F2 Powered by the Allison C20R engine with optimised tail rotor blades. FAA, TC and EASA approved.

Operators
The AS355 Écureuil 2 is used by both private individuals and companies, helicopter charter and training organizations as well as law enforcement and government use.

Military and government operators

Algerian Air Force

Argentine Naval Prefecture

 Bernie Wainscott Helicopters
 Surf Life Saving South Australia

 Austrian Federal Police

 Border Guard
Ministry of Emergency Situations

Brazilian Air Force
Brazilian Navy

Royal Cambodian Air Force

 Ontario Provincial Police

Chilean Army

Djibouti Air Force

 Jamaica Defence Force

Malawi Air Wing

 Royal Malaysia Police 

 Ministry of Interior

National Navy of Uruguay

 Massachusetts State Police

Former operators

Bophuthatswana Air Force

 Garda Air Support Unit

 New Zealand Police

Accidents and incidents

 On 8 May 1992, the Western Australian Police Polair One helicopter crashed while attempting to land on a sports oval for a public display in Kelmscott. The helicopter was destroyed after a fire started in the engine bay following ground impact. The Bureau of Air Safety Investigation report determined "The helicopter probably entered a vortex ring state during the final approach". The pilot and crewman received minor injuries, and the two passengers serious injuries, as a result of the accident.
 On 22 October 1996, an AS355 F1 Squirrel, registration G-CFLT, crashed in bad weather near Middlewich, Cheshire, England, killing all five on board. The people on board included Matthew Harding, a businessman and vice chairman of English football club Chelsea F.C. (the flight was returning to London from a Chelsea match in Bolton). The UK's Air Accidents Investigation Branch found that the pilot had insufficient qualifications and experience to fly in such poor conditions; the agency also recommended a ban on commercial VFR helicopter night flying.
 In July 1998, the Kent Air Ambulance, an AS355 F1 Squirrel, crashed in good weather after colliding with power cables near Burham whilst returning to Rochester Airport following an aborted call to attend a road accident. All three crew – the pilot, Graham Budden, and two paramedics, Tony Richardson and Mark Darby – were killed on impact.
 On 2 May 2007, Chelsea Football Club Vice President Philip Carter, founder of training company Carter and Carter, crashed in his part-owned Twin Squirrel registration G-BYPA returning from Liverpool John Lennon Airport after watching Chelsea play Liverpool F.C.

 On 18 August 2011, an AS-355F-2 (reg No/ VH-NTV) crashed near Lake Eyre in South Australia, resulting in three fatalities. The helicopter was owned by the Australian Broadcasting Corporation. On board were Gary Ticehurst (ABC chief helicopter pilot for 25 years), John Bean (cameraman) and Paul Lockyer (journalist). In response to the accident, Australia tightened the rules governing helicopter night flights.
 On 20 October 2011, a Belarus border patrol Eurocopter twin-engine helicopter crashed close to the village of Vileity near the Lithuanian border and burst into flames, killing all five people on board, including three members of a television crew.
 On 29 March 2017, a Eurocopter AS-355F-1 Ecureuil 2 was lost over the Snowdonia National Park in Wales whilst en route from Luton to Dublin, carrying five people on board.

Specifications (AS355F2)

See also

References

Citations

Bibliography

 Jackson, Paul. Jane's All The World's Aircraft 2003–2004. Coulsdon, Surry, UK: Jane's Information Group, 2003. .
 </ref>

Further reading

External links

 AS355 page on manufacturer’s website

Airbus Helicopters aircraft
Aérospatiale aircraft
1970s French helicopters
1970s French civil utility aircraft
Twin-turbine helicopters
Aircraft first flown in 1979